Isis is a French opera (tragédie en musique) in a prologue and five acts with music by Jean-Baptiste Lully and a libretto by Philippe Quinault, based on Ovid's Metamorphoses. The fifth of Lully's collaborations with Quinault, it was first performed on 5 January 1677 before the royal court of Louis XIV at the Château de Saint-Germain-en-Laye and in August received a run of public performances at the Théâtre du Palais-Royal. It was Lully's first published score (partbooks in 1677); a full score was published in 1719.

Performance history
Isis was revived only once during the remaining 38 years of Louis XIV's reign, on 14 February 1704. It was revived again in 1717–1718 and 1732–1733.

Roles

The ballets were danced by Pierre Beauchamp, Louis Pécourt, Magny, and Boutteville.

Synopsis

Prologue
The prologue, which includes the usual paean to Louis XIV, takes place in the palace of Fame (La Renommée) with Rumors (Rumeurs) and Noises (Bruits) dancing in attendance to the goddess. When Fame sings of "the glory and triumphant valor of the greatest of heroes," she is referring to Louis XIV. She is visited by Apollo with his retinue of Muses, who arrive from the sky, and Neptune with his retinue of Tritons, who arrive from the sea. Both groups are equipped with violins, lutes, and trumpets. When Neptune sings of the conqueror's recent adventures at sea, he is referring to the French naval victory over the Dutch and Spanish in 1676 in the Franco-Dutch War.

Acts 1–5
The plot of the tragedy of Isis is loosely adapted from one of the episodes in Ovid's Metamorphoses. Its plot parallels that of Lully's previous opera, Atys (in which  Sangaride, promised to Celoenus, is pursued by another and acquires a goddess as a rival). 'Isis centers around the god Jupiter's love for the nymph Io and the jealousy of Juno.
 
Io, daughter of Inachus, is promised in marriage to Hierax, but is pursued by Jupiter, and yields to this love in spite of her feelings of guilt.

Juno has Io imprisoned and tortured, leading Io to cry out to Jupiter for help. He swears faithfulness to Juno if she will spare Io, and Juno turns Io into a goddess: Isis, the Egyptian goddess.

Scandal
Lully's contemporaries interpreted this story as representing the volatile situation between two of the King's mistresses. The character of Io was equated with Madame de Ludres, Louis XIV's new favorite at court, to whom he had given lavish gifts. His long-time mistress, Madame de Montespan, "was furious and did everything she could to humiliate her." The subsequent scandale of the premiere ended the collaboration between Lully and Quinault for a time, and led to the dismissal of a number of members of Lully's artistic circle.

RecordingsIsis Soloists, La Simphonie du Marais, conducted by Hugo Reyne (Accord, 3 CDs, 2005)Isis Soloists, Les Talens Lyriques, conducted by Christophe Rousset (Aparte, 2 CDs, 2019)

References
Notes

Sources
 The New Grove French Baroque Masters, ed. Graham Sadler (Macmillan, 1986)
 The Viking Opera Guide ed. Holden (Viking, 1993)
 Le magazine de l'opéra baroque by Jean-Claude Brenac (in French)
 Parvopassu, Clelia Isis, in Gelli, Piero & Poletti, Filippo (ed), Dizionario dell'opera 2008, Milan, Baldini Castoldi Dalai, 2007, pp. 671–672
 Pitou, Spire (1983). The Paris Opéra: An Encyclopedia of Operas, Ballets, Composers, and Performers. Genesis and Glory, 1671–1715. Westport, Connecticut: Greenwood Press. .
 Rosow, Lois (1992). "Isis (ii)", vol. 2, p. 827, in The New Grove Dictionary of Opera (4 volumes), edited by Stanley Sadie. London: Macmillan. .
 Sadie, Stanley (ed.), The New Grove Dictionary of Opera, Grove (Oxford University Press), New York, 1997

 External links 
 Isis libretto of 1677, a different edition of the 1677 libretto (mentioning the names of performers), printed partbooks of 1677 (for performances at the Palais-Royal), period printed score, s.d. (but 1700 according to Gallica), and score of 1719 at Gallica
 Isis: High-resolution images of a 1677 manuscript copy of Isis Isis: High-resolution images of the first edition of Isis'' (1719)
 
 Isis: Libretto

Operas by Jean-Baptiste Lully
Tragédies en musique
French-language operas
Operas
1677 operas
Operas based on Metamorphoses
Egyptian mythology in music